Nižný Komárnik is a village and municipality in Svidník District in the Prešov Region of north-eastern Slovakia.

History
In historical records the village was first mentioned in 1618.

Geography
The municipality lies at an altitude of 370 metres and covers an area of 12.381 km2. It has a population of about 148 people.

External links
 
 
https://web.archive.org/web/20070513023228/http://www.statistics.sk/mosmis/eng/run.html

Villages and municipalities in Svidník District
Šariš